María José Argeri (born 16 July 1984) is an Argentine retired tennis player.

She 11 September 2006, she reached her best singles ranking of world number 149. On 25 September 2006, she peaked at number 105 in the doubles rankings. Argeri started playing tennis at the age of seven and won ten singles titles and 25 doubles titles on the ITF circuit in her career.

She made her WTA Tour main draw debut at the 2007 Copa Colsanitas in the doubles event partnering Letícia Sobral.

Playing for Argentina at the Fed Cup, Argeri has a win–loss record of 4–2.

ITF finals

Singles: 18 (10–8)

Doubles: 34 (25–9)

References

External links

 
 
 
 Maria-Jose Argeri at Tennis Explorer

1984 births
Living people
Argentine female tennis players
People from Tandil
Sportspeople from Buenos Aires Province
21st-century Argentine women